Elm Bluff, also known as Centreport, Shepardsville, and Shepardville, is an unincorporated community in Dallas County, Alabama.  It was named for the nearby bluff on the Alabama River and the closely associated Elm Bluff Plantation.

References

Unincorporated communities in Alabama
Unincorporated communities in Dallas County, Alabama